Lam Yuen-yee  (1984-2021) was a posthumous Chief Inspector of Hong Kong Police Marine Small Boat Division, who died in action on 25 September 2021 near Sha Chau Island in the northwest waters of Hong Kong after a smuggling speedboat slammed into her police interceptor, causing it to capsize. Lam and three other police officers on board fell into the sea. While three officers were rescued shortly after, Lam was found missing and her body was retrieved two days after near the coast of Yi O on Lantau Island.

A ceremony with the highest honours and a funeral procession was held for Lam on 2 November 2021. Lam was laid to rest in the Gallant Garden, a plot at Wo Hop Shek Public Cemetery reserved for civil servants who died on duty. Major Government officers including Chief Executive Carrie Lam Cheng Yuet-ngor attended the ceremony. A weekly press meeting with the Chief Executive and the meeting of the Executive Council was cancelled to make way for Lam’s funeral.

On 15 November 2021, Lam was posthumously awarded the Medal for Bravery (Gold) by the Chief Executive in recognition of her gallantry and selflessness displayed during the operation.

Career and legacy in Marine Police 
Lam joined the Hong Kong Police Force in 2007, starting her career as a police constable in Tuen Mun Police District. Lam rose quickly through the ranks to become an inspector in three years with her excellent abilities and renowned diligence. Lam joined the Marine Police in 2015 and later became the first female supervisor of Small Boat Division in 2020, leading this elite maritime unit of the Marine Police. During her tenure, Lam earned her good reputation as “Kryptonite of smuggling”, where she busted smuggling cases over the years, intercepting more than 70 speedboats and arrested more than 100 people. In a major anti-smuggling operation led by Lam in August 2020, Lam seized HK$37 million worth of animals and smuggled goods.

Death and aftermaths 
On 25 September 2021 at around 8 a.m., Lam was leading her team of four on a marine multi-mission interceptor to conduct a regular anti-smuggling operation in northwest waters of Hong Kong, near Chek Lap Kok International Airport. Lam noticed a number of suspected smuggling speedboats at Sha Chau and decided to chase one of them. During the pursuit, a speedboat ignored repeated police warnings and crashed to the right stern of Lam’s boat, causing the interceptor to sink and the four officers, including Lam, to fall into the sea. The officers were trapped underneath the speedboat after the collision. Rescuers later found the three other officers but Lam was missing. On 27 September 2021, the body of Lam was finally discovered near the shore at Yi O on Lantau Island two days after she fell into the sea. An initial autopsy confirmed that Lam drowned to death.

Her death triggered both the Hong Kong and Guangdong Police’s crackdown on smuggling operations across the border with mainland China. The Police Commissioner of Hong Kong Police Raymond Siu vowed to make the best endeavours to track down the culprit and ramp up crackdowns on smugglers. Until 11th October 2021, a joint operation - among Police, Customs and Excise Department, Food and Environmental Health Department, Health Department, Lands Department and the Government Flying Service, had so far led to the arrests of 365 people, in which 35 were believed to be part of the triad smuggling ring.

On 1 and 2 October 2021 the Guangdong authorities arrested two mainland Chinese men who are believed to have been on the speedboat that rammed the Hong Kong marine police vessel, causing the death of Lam. The two suspects could be tried in the mainland as they were arrested there, and Hong Kong police said the crash took place in mainland waters about 300 to 500 meters away from Hong Kong's waters.

Lam’s death also triggered derision from some members of the public. Speaking in a Legislative Council meeting, Secretary of Security Chris Tang Ping-keung said there were eight members from the Hong Kong Disciplined Services who have been being suspended from their duties after they had mocked the death of Lam. Tang said taunts at Lam were cold-blooded and no one should make sarcastic remarks or gloat over casualties, regardless of their political stance. On 12 November 2021, a former Hong Kong police officer was arrested and charged with seditious intent over the online comments he allegedly made about Lam.

Online production group HKGolden Music released a parody song entitled “Do not look for what fell into the sea” (Chinese: 墮海唔好搵) during the search for Lam. The song, now removed by the group, contained lyrics including "they will float back up once you stop looking for them," and “a few people falling into the sea is no big deal." Lawmaker Priscilla Leung Mei-fan slammed the group for releasing the song, saying "the practice is chilling. The whole city must condemn and hold [them] accountable."

References

1986 births
2021 deaths
Hong Kong police officers
Women police officers